Max Christopher Merz (born February 1, 1994) is a retired German professional basketball player. His last team was the Fraport Skyliners of the German Basketball Bundesliga. Merz played as point guard. Until 2009, Merz played in the youth department of MTV Kronberg. On April 28, 2017, it was announced that Merz would retire after the 2016–17 season.

References

1994 births
Living people
German men's basketball players
Sportspeople from Regensburg
Point guards
Skyliners Frankfurt players